Scioscia is a mountain of Lombardy, Italy. It has an elevation of 667 metres above sea level.

Mountains of Lombardy